The 1995 U.S. Open was the 95th U.S. Open, held June 15–18 at Shinnecock Hills Golf Club in Southampton, New York. It marked the 100th anniversary of the U.S. Open. Corey Pavin won his only major championship, two strokes ahead of runner-up 

Norman opened with rounds of 68-67, then fell back with 74 in the third round; Tom Lehman's 67 on Saturday tied Norman for the 54-hole lead. Phil Mickelson and Bob Tway were a stroke back at even par, while Pavin was at 212 (+2), tied for fifth with four others.

In the final round, Norman and Lehman were still tied at the turn, but Lehman bogeyed 11 and Norman bogeyed 12. Pavin had birdied 12, which brought him into a tie with Norman, Lehman, and Tway. Norman and Tway each then suffered bogeys, while Pavin took sole possession of the lead with a birdie at 15. Even with a Norman birdie at the 15th, his first since the opening hole of the third round, nobody could catch Pavin. He sealed the victory with a 4-wood approach to the 18th, running down the fairway as the ball was in the air and raising his hands in triumph after it ran onto the green. He carded a 68 for an even-par 280, two ahead of Norman, who shot 73.

In the final round, Neal Lancaster set a new U.S. Open record with a 29 on the back nine. Nineteen-year-old Tiger Woods, the reigning U.S. Amateur champion, played in his first U.S. Open but withdrew during the second round with a 

This was the third U.S. Open at Shinnecock Hills; it previously hosted in 1896 and 1986. It returned in 2004 and 2018.

Course layout

Lengths of the course for previous major championships:
, par 70 - 1986 U.S. Open
, par      - 1896 U.S. Open

Past champions in the field

Made the cut 

Source:

Missed the cut 

Source:

Television
After an absence of thirty years, NBC Sports returned as the broadcaster of the U.S. Open in the  The event was previously carried by ABC Sports for 29 years, from 1966  NBC carried the championship from 1954 through 1965, then from 1995 through 2014.

Round summaries

First round
Thursday, June 15, 1995

Second round
Friday, June 16, 1995

Amateurs: Courville (+9), Tidland (+9), Woods (WD).
Source:

Third round
Saturday, June 17, 1995

Source:

Final round
Sunday, June 18, 1995

Source:

Scorecard

Cumulative tournament scores, relative to par
{|class="wikitable" span = 50 style="font-size:85%;
|-
|style="background: Pink;" width=10|
|Birdie
|style="background: PaleGreen;" width=10|
|Bogey
|style="background: Green;" width=10|
|Double bogey
|}
Source:

References

External links
USOpen.com – 1995

U.S. Open (golf)
Golf in New York (state)
Sports in Long Island
U.S. Open
U.S. Open (golf)
U.S. Open (golf)
U.S. Open (golf)